The following is a 'list of stadiums in Europe.

 List 

Albania
Abdurrahman Roza Haxhiu Stadium – Lushnjë
Adush Muça Stadium – Ballsh
Arena Kombëtare – Tirana
Besa Stadium – Kavajë
Brian Filipi Stadium – Lezhë
Elbasan Arena – Elbasan
Ersekë Stadium – Ersekë
Flamurtari Stadium – Vlorë
Kamëz Stadium – Kamëz
Kastrioti Stadium – Krujë
Laçi Stadium – Laç
Liri Ballabani Stadium – Burrel
Loni Papuçiu Stadium – Fier
Loro Boriçi Stadium – Shkodër
Luz i Vogël Stadium – Luz i Vogël
Niko Dovana Stadium – Durrës
Peqin Stadium – Peqin
Qemal Stafa Stadium – Tirana
Selman Stërmasi Stadium – Tirana
Skënderbeu Stadium – Korçë
Subi Bakiri Stadium – Gjirokastër
Tomori Stadium – Berat
Zeqir Ymeri Stadium – Kukës

Andorra
Estadi Comunal d'Aixovall – Aixovall
Estadi Comunal d'Andorra la Vella – Andorra la Vella
Estadi Nacional  – Andorra la Vella

Austria
Ernst-Happel-Stadion – Vienna
Fill Metallbau Stadion – Ried im Innkreis
Gerhard Hanappi Stadium – Vienna
Hypo-Arena – Klagenfurt
Red Bull Arena – Salzburg
Tivoli-Neu – Innsbruck
UPC-Arena – Graz

Belarus
Barysaŭ-Arena – Barysaŭ
ASK Brescki – Brest
Centraĺny Stadium – Homieĺ
Dynama Stadium – Minsk
CSK Nioman – Hrodna
Spartak Stadium – Mahilioŭ
Traktar Stadium – Minsk
Viciebski CSK – Viciebsk

Belgium
Albertpark – Ostend
Bosuilstadion – Antwerp
Constant Vanden Stock Stadium – Anderlecht
Cristal Arena – Genk
Daknamstadion – Lokeren
Edmond Machtens Stadium – Molenbeek
Freethiel Stadion – Beveren
Guldensporen Stadion – Kortrijk
Herman Vanderpoortenstadion – Lier
Het Kuipje – Westerlo
Jan Breydel Stadium – Bruges
Jules Ottenstadion – Ghent
King Baudouin Stadium – Brussels
Olympisch Stadion – Antwerp
Oscar Vankesbeeck Stadion – Mechlin
Schiervelde Stadion – Roeselare
Staaienveld – Sint-Truiden
Stade Charles Tondreau – Mons
Stade du Pays de Charleroi – Charleroi
Stade du Tivoli – La Louvière
Stade Le Canonnier – Mouscron
Stade Maurice Dufrasne – Liège

Bosnia and Herzegovina
Bijeli Brijeg Stadium – Mostar
Bilino Polje – Zenica
Koševo Stadium – Sarajevo
East Sarajevo – East Sarajevo
Stadion Grbavica – Sarajevo
Gradski stadion (Orašje) – Orašje
Stadion Otoka – Sarajevo
Gradski stadion – Laktaši
Maxima Stadium – Modriča
Mokri Dolac Stadium – Posušje
Stadion Pecara – Široki Brijeg
Stadion Pirota – Travnik
Pod Boricima Stadion – Bihać
Police Stadium – Trebinje
Stadion Tušanj – Tuzla
Vrapčići Stadium – Mostar
Gradski stadion – Žepče
Gradski stadion – Bijeljina

 Bulgaria 
 Balgarska Armiya Stadium – Sofia
 Beroe Stadium – Stara Zagora
 Georgi Asparuhov Stadium – Sofia
 Gradski Stadium – Ruse
 Stadium Hristo Botev – Blagoevgrad
 Hristo Botev Stadium – Gabrovo
 Hristo Botev Stadium – Plovdiv
 Hristo Botev Stadium – Vratza
 Lokomotiv Stadium – Plovdiv
 Lokomotiv Stadium – Sofia
 Lovech Stadium – Lovech
 Naftex Stadium – Bourgas
 New Varna Stadium – Varna
 Panayot Volov Stadium – Shumen
 Plovdiv Stadium – Plovdiv
 Rakovski Stadium – Sevlievo
 Slavia Stadium – Sofia
 Septemvri Stadium – Sofia
 Spartak Stadium – Pleven
 Spartak Stadium – Sandanski
 Spartak Stadium – Varna
 Ticha Stadium – Varna
 Vasil Levski National Stadium – Sofia
 Yuri Gagarin Stadium – Varna

Croatia
Gradski stadion u Koprivnici – Koprivnica
Gradski stadion u Sinju – Sinj 
Gradski stadion u Sisku – Sisak 
Stadion Varteks – Varaždin
Stadion Gradski vrt – Osijek
Stadion Hitrec-Kacian – Zagreb 
Stadion Kantrida – Rijeka
Stadion Kranjčevićeva – Zagreb
Stadion Maksimir – Zagreb
Stadion Park mladeži – Split 
Stadion Poljud – Split
Stadion Rujevica – Rijeka
Stadion Stanovi – Zadar 
Stadion Stari plac – Split
Stadion Šubićevac – Šibenik 
Stadion Velika Gorica – Velika Gorica

Cyprus
Ammochostos Stadium – Larnaca
Antonis Papadopoulos Stadium – Larnaca
Ethnikos Achna Stadium – Achna
Geroskipou stadium – Geroskipou
GSP Stadium – Nicosia
GSZ Stadium – Larnaca
Makario Stadium – Nicosia
Pafiako Stadium – Paphos
Peyia Municipal Stadium – Peyia
Tasos Markou Stadium – Paralimni
Tsirion Stadium – Limassol

Czech Republic

Bazaly – Ostrava
Eden Arena (formerly Synot Tip Arena) – Prague
Generali Arena – Prague
Městský fotbalový stadion Miroslava Valenty – Uherské Hradiště
Stadion Evžena Rošického – Prague
Stadion Juliska – Prague
Stadion Za Lužánkami – Brno
Strahov Stadium – Prague

Denmark

Atletion – Århus
Blue Water Arena – Esbjerg
Brøndby Stadium – Brøndby
CASA Arena Horsens – Horsens
Energi Nord Arena – Aalborg
Farum Park – Farum
Haderslev Fodboldstadion – Haderslev
MCH Arena – Herning
Parken Stadium – Copenhagen
Silkeborg Stadion – Silkeborg
TRE-FOR Park – Odense
Viborg Stadion – Viborg

Estonia

A. Le Coq Arena – Tallinn
Kadrioru Stadium – Tallinn
Kalevi Keskstaadion – Tallinn
Pärnu Kalevi Stadium – Pärnu
Rakvere Stadium – Rakvere
Tamme Stadium – Tartu

Faroe Islands
Gundadalur – Tórshavn
Svangaskarð – Toftir
Tórsvøllur – Tórshavn

Finland
Helsinki Olympic Stadium – Helsinki
Hietalahti Stadium – Vaasa
Ratina Stadion – Tampere
Salpausselkä skiing stadium – Lahti
Sonera Stadium – Helsinki
Veritas Stadion – Turku

France
Allianz Riviera – Nice
Amable-et-Micheline-Lozai Stadium – Le Petit-Quevilly
Circuit de la Sarthe – Le Mans
MMArena – Le Mans
Parc des Princes – Paris
Stade Chaban-Delmas – Bordeaux
Stade de France – Saint-Denis, metro Paris
Stade de Gerland – Lyon
Stade de la Beaujoire – Nantes
Stade de la Meinau – Strasbourg
Stade de la Mosson – Montpellier
Stade de l'Abbé-Deschamps – Auxerre
Stade Félix-Bollaert – Lens
Stade Pierre-Mauroy – Lille
Stade Roland Garros – Paris
Stade Saint-Symphorien – Metz
Stade Vélodrome – Marseille
Stadium Municipal – Toulouse
Stadium Nord Lille Métropole – Lille

Germany

Allianz Arena – Munich
BayArena – Leverkusen
Bielefelder Alm – Bielefeld
Borussia-Park – Mönchengladbach
BZA Raumerstraße – Essen
Coface Arena – Mainz
Commerzbank-Arena – Frankfurt
DKB-Arena – Rostock
Dreisamstadion – Freiburg
Embdena-Stadion – Emden
Energieteam Arena – Paderborn
Esprit Arena – Düsseldorf
Frankenstadion – Nuremberg
Fritz-Walter-Stadion – Kaiserslautern
Georg-Melches-Stadion – Essen
Gerry Weber Stadion – Halle, NRW
Grotenburg Stadion – Krefeld
Grugastadion – Essen
HDI-Arena – Hanover (Niedersachsenstadion)
Hermann Löns Stadium – Paderborn
Ludwigsparkstadion – Saarbrücken
Mathias-Stinnes-Stadion – Essen
Mercedes-Benz Arena – Stuttgart
Müngersdorfer Stadion – Cologne
Nattenberg Stadion – Lüdenscheid
Olympic Stadium – Berlin
Olympic Stadium – Munich
Osnatel-Arena – Osnabrück (Bremer Brücke)
Red Bull Arena – Leipzig
Rot-Weiss Tennis Club – Berlin
Rothenbaum – Hamburg
Rudolf-Harbig-Stadium – Dresden
Ruhrstadion – Bochum
Sportpark am Hallo – Essen
Stadion am Bieberer Berg – Offenbach am Main
Stadion am Bruchweg – Mainz
Stadion Bäuminghausstraße – Essen
Stadion der Freundschaft – Cottbus
Südweststadion – Ludwigshafen am Rhein
Uhlenkrugstadion – Essen
Veltins-Arena – Gelsenkirchen (Arena AufSchalke)
Volksparkstadion – Hamburg
Volkswagen Arena – Wolfsburg
Weserstadion – Bremen
Westfalenstadion – Dortmund
Wildparkstadion – Karlsruhe

Gibraltar
Victoria Stadium – Gibraltar

Greece

Kaftanzoglio Stadium – Thessaloniki
Karaiskaki Stadium – Piraeus
Nea Smyrni Stadium – Athens
Olympic Baseball Centre – Athens
Olympic Hockey Centre – Athens
Olympic Softball Stadium – Athens
Kleanthis Vikelides Stadium – Thessaloniki
Olympic Stadium – Athens
Olympic Tennis Centre – Athens
Olympic Velodrome – Athens
Panathinaiko Stadium – Athens
Pankritiko Stadium – Heraklion
Panpeloponnesian Stadium – Patras
Panthessalian Stadium – Volos
Toumba Stadium – Thessaloniki

Hungary
Bozsik Aréna – Budapest
Diósgyőri Stadion – Miskolc
ETO Park – Győr
Fehérvári úti Stadion – Paks
Groupama Aréna – Budapest
Haladás Sportkomplexum – Szombathely
Hidegkuti Nándor Stadion – Budapest
MOL Aréna Sóstó – Székesfehérvár
Nagyerdei Stadion – Debrecen
Pancho Aréna – Felcsút
Puskás Aréna – Budapest
Szusza Ferenc Stadium – Budapest
ZTE Aréna – Zalaegerszeg

Iceland
Akranesvöllur – Akranes
Akureyrarvöllur – Akureyri
Fylkisvöllur – Reykjavík
Hásteinsvöllur – Vestmannæyjar
Kaplakrikavöllur – Hafnarfjörður
Keflavíkurvöllur – Keflavík
Kópavogsvöllur – Kópavogur
KR-völlur – Reykjavík
Laugardalsvöllur – Reykjavík

Ireland

Breffni Park – Cavan
Carlisle Grounds – Bray
Croke Park – Dublin
Dalymount Park – Dublin
Donnybrook Stadium – Dublin
Eamonn Deacy Park – Galway
Ferrycarrig Park – Wexford
Finn Park – Ballybofey
Fitzgerald Stadium – Killarney
Gaelic Grounds – Limerick
Galway Sportsgrounds – Galway
Kilcully – Cork
Jackman Park – Limerick
Lansdowne Road – Dublin
MacHale Park – Castlebar
Morton Stadium – Dublin
Musgrave Park – Cork
Nowlan Park – Kilkenny
O'Moore Park – Portlaoise
Oriel Park – Dundalk
Páirc Uí Chaoimh – Cork
Páirc Uí Rinn – Cork
Parnell Park – Dublin
Pearse Stadium – Galway
RDS Arena – Dublin
Richmond Park – Dublin
Semple Stadium – Thurles
Station Road – Newbridge, County Kildare
St Colman's Park – Cobh
Strokestown Road – Longford
Thomond Park – Limerick
Tolka Park – Dublin
Turners Cross – Cork
UCD Bowl – Dublin
United Park – Drogheda
Waterford Regional Sports Centre – Waterford

Italy

Arena Civica, also known as Arena Napoleonica  – Milan
Colosseum (disused) – Rome
Foro Italico – Rome
Juventus Stadium – Turin
San Siro, also known as the Stadio Giuseppe Meazza'' – Milan
Stadio Artemio Franchi – Florence
Stadio Atleti Azzurri d'Italia – Bergamo
Stadio Brianteo – Monza (Milan)
Stadio Città di Arezzo (formerly Stadio Comunale) – Arezzo
Stadio Danilo Martelli – Mantua
Stadio della Vittoria – Bari
Stadio delle Alpi – Turin
Stadio Ezio Scida – Crotone
Stadio Flaminio – Rome
Stadio Friuli – Udine
Stadio Luigi Ferraris – Genoa
Stadio Marc'Antonio Bentegodi – Verona
Stadio Mario Rigamonti – Brescia
Stadio Olimpico – Rome
Stadio Olimpico di Torino – Turin
Stadio Renato Dall'Ara – Bologna
Stadio Renzo Barbera – Palermo
Stadio San Filippo – Messina
Stadio San Nicola – Bari
Stadio San Paolo – Naples
Stadio Sant'Elia – Cagliari
Stadio Via del Mare – Lecce
Velodromo Vigorelli – Milan

Jersey
Springfield Stadium – St. Helier

Kosovo
Fadil Vokrri Stadium – Pristina
Adem Jashari Olympic Stadium – Mitrovica
Zahir Pajaziti Stadium – Podujevë

Latvia
Skonto Stadium – Riga
Daugava Stadium – Liepāja
Ventspils Olimpiskais Stadions – Ventspils
Olympic Sports Center of Zemgale – Jelgava
Celtnieks Stadium – Daugavpils
Daugava Stadium – Daugavpils

Liechtenstein
Rheinpark Stadion – Vaduz

Lithuania
Aukštaitija Stadium – Panevėžys
Lithuania National Stadium – Vilnius
S. Darius and S. Girėnas Stadium – Kaunas
Vėtra Stadium – Vilnius
Žalgiris Stadium – Vilnius
Žalgiris Stadium – Klaipėda

Luxembourg
Stade de Luxembourg – Luxembourg City

North Macedonia
Philip II Arena – Skopje
Stadion Tumbe Kafe – Bitola
Gradski stadion Tetovo – Tetovo

Malta
Ta' Qali National Stadium – Ta' Qali

Moldova
Sheriff Stadium – Tiraspol
Stadionul Constructorul – Chişinău
Stadionul Moldova – Chişinău
Stadionul Republican – Chişinău
Zimbru Stadium – Chişinău

Monaco
Monte Carlo Country Club – Monte Carlo
Stade Louis II – Fontvieille

Montenegro
Gradski Stadion – Berane
Gradski Stadion – Nikšić
Podgorica City Stadium – Podgorica
Stadion Pod Malim Brdom – Petrovac

Netherlands

 Abe Lenstra Stadion – Heerenveen
 AFAS Stadion – Alkmaar
 Cambuurstadion – Leeuwarden
 Cars Jeans Stadion – The Hague
 Covebo Stadion – De Koel – Venlo
 De Adelaarshorst – Deventer
 De Grolsch Veste – Enschede
 De Kuip – Rotterdam
 De Oude Meerdijk – Emmen
 Erve Asito – Almelo
 Fortuna Sittard Stadion – Sittard
 Frans Heesenstadion – Oss
 GelreDome – Arnhem
 Goffertstadion – Nijmegen
 Hitachi Capital Mobility Stadion – Groningen
 Jan Louwers Stadion – Eindhoven
 Johan Cruijff ArenA – Amsterdam
 Koning Willem II Stadion – Tilburg
 Kras Stadion – Volendam
MAC³PARK stadion – Zwolle
 Mandemakers Stadion – Waalwijk
 Parkstad Limburg Stadion – Kerkrade
 Philips Stadion – Eindhoven
 Rabobank IJmond Stadion – Velsen
 Rat Verlegh Stadion – Breda
 Riwal Hoogwerkers Stadion – Dordrecht
 SolarUnie Stadion – Helmond
 Spartastadion Het Kasteel – Rotterdam
 Stadion De Geusselt – Maastricht
 Stadion De Vijverberg – Doetinchem
 Stadion De Vliert – 's-Hertogenbosch
 Stadion Galgenwaard – Utrecht
 Van Donge & De Roo Stadion – Rotterdam
 Yanmar Stadion – Almere

Cyprus
GSE Stadium – Famagusta
Zafer Stadı – Güzelyurt

Norway
Aker Stadion – Molde
Alfheim stadion – Tromsø
Åråsen Stadion – Lillestrøm
Aspmyra Stadion – Bodø
Bislett Stadion – Oslo
Brann Stadion – Bergen
Briskeby Arena – Hamar
Bryne Stadion – Bryne
Color Line Stadion – Ålesund
Fredrikstad Stadium – Fredrikstad
Holmenkollen ski jump – Oslo
Lerkendal Stadion – Trondheim
Lysgårdsbakken – Lillehammer
Marienlyst Stadion – Drammen
Melløs Stadion – Moss
Nadderud stadion – Bekkestua
Skagerak Arena – Skien
Sør Arena –  Kristiansand
Storstadion – Sandefjord
Ullevaal Stadion – Oslo
Viking Stadion – Stavanger

Poland

Jagiellonia Stadium – Białystok
Dialog Arena – Lubin
Suzuki Arena – Kielce
Marshal Józef Piłsudski Stadium – Kraków
National Stadium – Warsaw
PGE Arena Gdańsk – Gdańsk
Polish Army Stadium – Warsaw
Silesian Stadium – Chorzów
Stadion GOSiR – Gdynia
Ernest Pohl Stadium – Zabrze
Stadion Widzewa – Łódź
Tychy Stadium – Tychy
Arena Lublin – Lublin
Henryk Reyman Stadium – Kraków
Lech Stadium – Poznań
Wrocław Stadium – Wrocław

Portugal
Estádio Algarve – Sao João da Venda, between Faro and Loulé
Estádio Cidade de Barcelos – Barcelos
Estádio Cidade de Coimbra – Coimbra
Estádio da Luz – Lisbon
Estádio de São Miguel, Ponta Delgada
Estádio do Bessa XXI – Porto
Estádio do Bonfim – Setúbal
Estádio do Dragão – Porto
Estádio do Restelo – Lisbon
Estádio dos Barreiros – Funchal
Estádio D. Afonso Henriques – Guimarães
Estádio José Alvalade – Lisbon
Estádio Dr. Magalhães Pessoa – Leiria
Estádio Municipal de Águeda – Águeda Municipality
Estádio Municipal de Aveiro – Aveiro
Estádio Municipal de Braga – Braga
Estádio Nacional – Cruz Quebrada - Dafundo, Oeiras
Estádio Primeiro de Maio – Braga
Estádio Prof. Dr. José Vieira de Carvalho – Maia
Estoril Court Central – Cruz Quebrada - Dafundo, Oeiras
Autódromo do algarve – Portimão

Romania
Arena Națională – Bucharest
Stadionul Dinamo – Bucharest
Stadionul Giuleşti-Valentin Stănescu – Bucharest
Stadionul Steaua – Bucharest
Stadionul Cetate – Alba Iulia
Stadionul Francisc von Neumann – Arad
Stadionul Municipal – Bacău
Stadionul Municipal – Botoşani
Stadionul Municipal – Braşov
Stadionul Silviu Ploeşteanu – Braşov
Stadionul Municipal – Brăila
Stadionul Concordia – Chiajna
Stadionul Dr. Constantin Rădulescu – Cluj-Napoca
Cluj Arena – Cluj-Napoca
Stadionul Ion Moina – Cluj-Napoca
Stadionul Farul – Constanţa
Stadionul Extensiv – Craiova
Stadionul Ion Oblemenco – Craiova
Stadionul Municipal – Drobeta-Turnu Severin
Stadionul Marin Anastasovici – Giurgiu
Stadionul Nicolae Rainea – Galaţi
Stadionul Michael Klein – Hunedoara
Stadionul Emil Alexandrescu – Iaşi
Stadionul Iftimie Ilisei – Medgidia
Stadionul Gaz Metan – Mediaş
Stadionul Iuliu Bodola – Oradea
 Stadionul Viitorul – Ovidiu
Stadionul Jiul – Petroşani
Stadionul Ceahlăul – Piatra Neamţ
Stadionul Nicolae Dobrin – Piteşti
Stadionul Astra – Ploieşti
Stadionul Ilie Oană – Ploieşti
Stadionul Moldova – Roman
Stadionul Olimpia – Satu Mare
 Stadionul Municipal – Sibiu
Stadionul Areni – Suceava
Stadionul Tudor Vladimirescu – Târgu Jiu
Stadionul Trans-Sil – Târgu Mureş
Stadionul Delta – Tulcea
Stadionul Dan Păltinișanu – Timișoara
Stadionul Anghel Iordănescu – Voluntari

Russia
Akhmat-Arena – Grozny
Anzhi Arena – Kaspiysk
Arena CSKA – Moscow
Arena Khimki – Khimki
Arsenal Stadium – Tula
Central Dynamo Stadium – Moscow
Central Stadium – Astrakhan
Central Stadium – Kazan
Central Stadium – Volgograd
Dynamo Stadium – Moscow
Eduard Streltsov Stadium – Moscow
Fisht Olympic Stadium – Sochi
Kazan Arena – Kazan
Khazar Stadion – Makhachkala
Khimik Stadion – Kemerovo
Krasnodar Stadium – Krasnodar
Krestovsky Stadium – St. Petersburg
Kuban Stadium – Krasnodar
Lokomotiv Stadium – Moscow
Luzhniki Stadium – Moscow
Metallurg Stadion – Samara
Olimp-2 – Rostov-on-Don
Otkrytiye Arena – Moscow
Petrovsky Stadium – St. Petersburg
Republikan Spartak Stadion – Vladikavkaz
SKA SKVO Stadion – Rostov-on-Don
Tsentralnyi Profsoyuz Stadion – Voronezh

San Marino
Stadio Olimpico – Serravalle

Serbia

Rajko Mitić stadium – Belgrade
Partizan Stadium – Belgrade
Omladinski Stadium – Belgrade
Čair Stadium – Niš
Smederevo Stadium – Smederevo
Čika Dača Stadium – Kragujevac
Karađorđe Stadium – Novi Sad
Jagodina City Stadium – Jagodina
Pirot Stadium – Pirot
Subotica City Stadium – Subotica
Železnik Stadium – Belgrade
Užice City Stadium – Užice
Novi Pazar City Stadium – Novi Pazar
Čika Dača Stadium – Kragujevac
Mladost Stadium – Kruševac
Zemun Stadium – Belgrade
City Stadium Šabac – Šabac
Yumco Stadium – Vranje
City Stadium Kikinda – Kikinda
Čukarički Stadion – Belgrade
King Peter I Stadium – Belgrade
Detelinara Stadium – Novi Sad
Hajduk Stadium – Kula
Slavko Maletin Vava Stadium – Bačka Palanka
Stadium next to Pyrite – Bor
Metalac Stadium – Gornji Milanovac
Ivanjica Stadium – Ivanjica

Slovakia
Štadión Antona Malatinského – Trnava
Tehelné Pole Stadion – Bratislava
Vsesportový Areal – Košice

Slovenia
Arena Petrol – Celje
Bežigrad Stadium – Ljubljana
Stožice Stadium – Ljubljana
Ljudski vrt – Maribor
Stadion Matije Gubca – Krško
Bonifika Stadium – Koper

Spain

Camp Nou – Barcelona
El Molinón – Gijón
Estadio Anoeta – San Sebastián
Estadio Balaídos – Vigo
Estadio Benito Villamarín – Seville
Estadio Carlos Tartiere – Oviedo
Estadio de la Cartuja – Seville
Estadio Gran Canaria – Las Palmas
Estadio José Rico Pérez – Alicante
Estadio La Rosaleda – Málaga
Estadi Olímpic Lluís Companys – Barcelona
Estadio Manuel Martínez Valero – Elche
Estadio Metropolitano – Madrid
Estadio Nueva Condomina – Murcia
Estadio Ramón Sánchez Pizjuán – Seville
Estadio Riazor – A Coruña
Estadio San Mamés – Bilbao
Estadio Santiago Bernabéu – Madrid
Estadi RCDE – Cornellà de Llobregat
La Romareda – Zaragoza
Mestalla – Valencia

Sweden
Behrn Arena – Örebro
Borås Arena – Borås
Domnarvsvallen – Borlänge
Fredriksskans – Kalmar
Friends Arena – Solna, Stockholm
Gamla Ullevi – Gothenburg
Grimsta IP – Stockholm
Guldfågeln Arena – Kalmar
Idrottsparken – Norrköping
Malmö Stadion – Malmö
Norrporten Arena – Sundsvall
Olympia – Helsingborg
Örjans Vall – Halmstad
Rambergsvallen – Gothenburg
Råsunda Stadium – Solna, Stockholm
Swedbank Park – Västerås
Stadion – Malmö
Söderstadion – Stockholm
Södertälje Fotbollsarena – Södertälje
Stadsparksvallen – Jönköping
Starke Arvid Arena – Ljungskile
Tele2 Arena – Stockholm
Stockholm Olympic Stadium – Stockholm
Strömvallen – Gävle
Ullevi – Gothenburg
Vångavallen – Trelleborg
Värendsvallen – Växjö

Switzerland
Letzigrund – Zürich
St. Jakob-Park – Basel
Stade de Genève – Geneva
Stade de Suisse, Wankdorf – Bern
Stadion Zürich – Zürich

Turkey
Atatürk Olympic Stadium – Istanbul
BJK İnönü Stadium – Istanbul
Turk Telekom Arena – Istanbul
Karabük University Stadium – Karabük

Ukraine

Avanhard Stadium – Luhansk
Avanhard Stadium – Lutsk
Avanhard Stadium – Uzhhorod
Butovsky Vorskla Stadium – Poltava
Central Stadium – Zaporizhia
Chornomorets Stadium – Odessa
Dnipro Arena – Dnipro
Donbass Arena – Donetsk
Volodymyr Boiko Stadium – Mariupol
Lobanovsky Dynamo Stadium – Kyiv
Lokomotiv Stadium – Simferopol
MCS Rukh – Ivano-Frankivsk
Metalist Stadium – Kharkiv
Metalurh Stadium – Kryvyi Rih
Olimpiysky National Sports Complex – Kyiv
RSC Olimpiyskiy – Donetsk
Tsentralnyi Stadion – Cherkasy
Ukraina Stadium – Lviv
Yuvileiny Stadium – Sumy

United Kingdom

England

Northern Ireland

Brandywell Stadium – Derry
Casement Park – Belfast
Healy Park – Omagh
The Oval – Belfast
Ravenhill Stadium – Belfast
Solitude – Belfast
Windsor Park – Belfast

Scotland

Murrayfield Stadium – Edinburgh
Celtic Park – Glasgow
Hampden Park – Glasgow
Ibrox Stadium – Glasgow

Wales

Cardiff Arms Park – Cardiff
Cardiff City Stadium – Cardiff
Liberty Stadium – Swansea
Millennium Stadium – Cardiff
Parc y Scarlets – Llanelli
SWALEC Stadium – Cardiff

See also
List of stadiums in Africa
List of stadiums in Asia
List of stadiums in Central America and the Caribbean
List of stadiums in North America
List of stadiums in Oceania
List of stadiums in South America
List of European stadiums by capacity

External links 
Atlas of worldwide soccer stadiums for GoogleEarth ***NEW***
worldstadiums
Football Stadiums
Football Temples of the World

Stadiums
E